Shirakawa Dam is an earth-fill dam located in Nara prefecture in Japan. The dam is used for agriculture. The catchment area of the dam is 6 km2. The dam impounds about 15  ha of land when full and can store 1360 thousand cubic meters of water. The construction of the dam was started in 1971 and completed in 1996.

References

Dams in Nara Prefecture
1996 establishments in Japan